Involutin is an organic compound that can be found in mushrooms belonging to the genus Paxillus. It is part of a class of compounds known as diarylcyclopentenones. It is derived from atromentin which was shown from 3′,3″,5′,5″-d4-atromentin (deuterated atromentin) feeding studies and observing the deuterated incorporation into two atromentin derivatives (i.e., an increase in monoisotopic mass by 4 mass units), gyrocyanin and its oxidation product gyroporin. It has been shown to be a Fe3+-reductant and presumed to be involved in Fenton chemistry for the initial attack of dead plant matter.

References

Polyphenols
Cyclopentenes